Gregorio Morachioli (born 27 February 2000) is an Italian professional footballer who plays as a winger for  club Bari.

Club career
Born in La Spezia, Morachioli was formed on local club Spezia Calcio, and a loan to Juventus F.C. Youth Sector. He was loaned to Pistoiese for the 2019–20, and made his Serie C and professional debut on 15 September 2019 against Carrarese.

On 7 May 2021, he signed for Renate.

On 31 January 2023, Morachioli joined Serie B club Bari for an undisclosed fee, signing a deal until June 2026.

References

External links
 
 

2000 births
Living people
People from La Spezia
Sportspeople from the Province of La Spezia
Footballers from Liguria
Italian footballers
Association football wingers
Spezia Calcio players
U.S. Pistoiese 1921 players
Imolese Calcio 1919 players
A.C. Renate players
S.S.C. Bari players
Serie C players